Montagny-en-Vexin (literally Montagny in Vexin) is a commune in the Oise department in northern France.

It takes its name from Vexin, a former province between Île-de-France and Normandy.

See also
 Communes of the Oise department
 Vexin

References

Communes of Oise